João Pereira (born 10 July 1977 in Benguela), is a retired Angolan footballer. He last played for Atlético Sport Aviação.

Career
Jamba is an archetype of old fashioned defending.  He is mostly very reliable and consistent.

International career
The central back is a former member of the national team, and was called up to the 2006 World Cup. He has played in 29 straight international competitions for Angola, making him a leader on an otherwise young club. In April 2006, his performances were acknowledged when he was voted Angola's best home-based player in a national radio poll.

Background
His nickname, "Jamba," means "Elephant" in Umbundu, a language spoken in southern Angola.

National team statistics

References

External links

1977 births
Living people
Angola international footballers
Angolan footballers
2006 FIFA World Cup players
2006 Africa Cup of Nations players
2008 Africa Cup of Nations players
Association football defenders
People from Benguela
Atlético Sport Aviação players
Atlético Petróleos de Luanda players
Girabola players